NanoSail-D was a small satellite which was to have been used by NASA's Ames Research Center to study the deployment of a solar sail in space. The satellite was lost shortly after launch due to a problem with the launch vehicle carrying it; however, a replacement, NanoSail-D2, was launched in 2010 to complete its mission.

Spacecraft 
NanoSail-D was to have been deployed on the third flight of the Falcon 1 launch vehicle, which was launched from Omelek Island at 03:34 UTC on 3 August 2008. One of two CubeSats aboard, along with PRESat, it was a secondary payload to the Trailblazer which was to have been operated by the Operationally Responsive Space Office of the United States Department of Defense. The launch was conducted by SpaceX, and also carried a space burial payload (Celestis-07) for Celestis. Two minutes and forty seconds after launch, the spent first stage of the rocket was jettisoned; however, unexpected residual thrust caused it to recontact the second stage, which resulted in the rocket being thrown off course. Unable to achieve orbit, the rocket and payloads fell into the Pacific Ocean.

It would have been operational for around seven days, after which time it would have been expected to run out of power. The satellite was developed and tested in four months.

NanoSail-D2 was built as a ground spare for NanoSail-D. Following the launch failure of NanoSail-D in August 2008, NanoSail-D2 was launched on a Minotaur IV launch vehicle in November 2010, and deployed from the FASTSAT satellite.

See also 

 List of CubeSats

Solar sail CubeSats
 LightSail-1
 Near-Earth Asteroid Scout

References 

Spacecraft launched in 2008
Satellite launch failures
Solar sail spacecraft
CubeSats
SpaceX payloads contracted by NASA